JOKB may refer to:
 Jogye Order of Korean Buddhism
 Jordan Kuwait Bank